The MV Erika (formerly Shinsei Maru, Glory Ocean, Interman Prosperity, South Energy, Jahre Energy, Prime Nobel and Nobel) was a tanker built in 1975 and last chartered by Total-Fina-Elf. It sank off the coast of France in 1999, causing a major environmental disaster.

Background 

Erika was one of eight sister ships built in Japan. Despite having 10% less steel than many other tankers of similar size, Erika was very popular amongst shipping companies because of its relative inexpensiveness.

Sinking 

On December 8, 1999, she sailed out of Dunkerque, bound for Livorno and with a cargo of around 31,000 tons of heavy fuel oil.

As she entered the Bay of Biscay, the Erika ran into a heavy storm. On December 12, 1999, she broke in two and sank, releasing thousands of tons of oil into the sea, killing marine life and polluting shores around Brittany, France.

According to the official inquiry by the Dunkerque Tribunal, the Principal Shareholder of Tevere Shipping is Giuseppe Savarese, owner of the Erika since 1996. Savarese lives in London and was personally responsible for finance, administration, legal, commercial, hull and machinery insurance and P&I insurance matters.

The Erika's technical and maritime management company was Panship, a Ravenna-based corporation incorporated in 1997. The Pollara and Vitiello families each own 50 percent. The company did not employ a specialist in naval architecture or vessel strength which is typical for such companies. With regards to maintenance, Panship defined the scope and nature of maintenance work in addition to creating and evaluating calls for bids for such work. All decisions were submitted to Giuseppe Savarese. Erika's was registered under a Maltese flag. The Classification Society for classed the Erika was RINA or the Foundation Registro Italiano Navale ed Aeronautica, based in Genoa. Malta like most Flag States delegates compliance with International Safety Management Code of International Maritime Organization to Classification Societies such as RINA. RINA issued all safety certificates for the Erika.

List of Certificates issued for the Erika by RINA:

International Load Line Certificate - Dated December 16, 1998 valid until August 31, 2003
Safety Construction Certificate - Dated December 16, 1998 valid until August 31, 2003
International Pollution Certificate - Dated December 16, 1998 valid until August 31, 2003
Safety Equipment Certificate - Dated December 16, 1998 valid until August 14, 2000
Radio Certificate - Dated November 23, 1999 valid until March 31, 2000

Total said that the classification society, Registro Italiano Navale had reported that the tanker was in good condition, and that it routinely requires certificates of good condition for vessels more than 20 years old.

The accident triggered new EU-legislation as regard to transport by sea.

On January 16, 2008, Total SA, Giuseppe Savarese (the shipowner), Antonio Pollara (the handler) and RINA (the expert company) were sentenced in solidum to pay indemnities of €192 million (US$280 million), plus individual  penalties. The judgement, while recognizing the risks inherent to oceangoing vessels, reckons Total SA was "guilty of imprudence", from the fact that Total SA did not take into account "the age of the ship", (nearly 25 years), and "the discontinuity of its technical handling and maintenance".

On March 30, 2010, Total SA lost their appeal to overturn the court's decision.

See also

Oil spill
EU Erika packages of law I, II and III

Notes

References

External links
Report of the Enquiry into the Sinking of the Erika off the coasts of Brittany on 12 December 1999 (Archive) - Permanent Commission of Enquiry into Accidents at Sea (Commission Permanente d'Enquêtes sur les Événements de Mer, CPEM) - Hosted by the Bureau d'Enquêtes sur les Événements de Mer
Rapport d’enquête sur le naufrage de l’ERIKA (Archive)  - CPEM at BEAmer
 Annex (Archive) 
Report - Total SA
Ministry of the Environment  (Archived on web.archive.org)
Dossier of the Ministry of Defense  (Archived on web.archive.org)
 Erika trial, Paris 2007
judgement Erika (in french)  january 16, 2008
  slides of Erika by her crew few hours before sinking
GMDSS Transmissions
Chronology
 Erika trial appeal - Paris october 5th -november 18th 2009
  appeal ruling (in french), march 30, 2010 

Oil tankers
Oil spills in France
Shipwrecks in the Bay of Biscay
Maritime incidents in 1999
TotalEnergies
Ships of Malta
1974 ships